Catocala optata is a moth of the family Erebidae first described by Jean-Baptiste Godart in 1824. It is known from south-central Europe (except Greece) and north-western Africa.

The wingspan is 61–63 mm. Adults are on wing from July to September.

The larvae have been recorded feeding on Salix caprea and Salix viminalis. The larvae can be found from June to July.

Subspecies
Catocala optata optata
Catocala optata atlantica Le Cerf, 1932 (Morocco)

References

External links

Fauna Europaea

Lepiforum e.V.

optata
Moths of Europe
Moths of Africa
Moths described in 1824